IEC 62325 is a set of standards related to deregulated energy market communications, based on the Common Information Model. IEC 62325 is a part of the International Electrotechnical Commission's (IEC) Technical Committee 57 (TC57) reference architecture for electric power systems, and is the responsibility of Working Group 16 (WG16).

Standard documents
IEC 62325 consists of the following parts, detailed in separate IEC 62325 standard documents:
 IEC 62325-301: Common information model (CIM) extensions for markets
 IEC 62325-351: CIM European market model exchange profile
 IEC 62325-450: Profile and context modelling rules
 IEC 62325-451-1: Acknowledgement business process and contextual model for CIM European market
 IEC 62325-451-2: Scheduling business process and contextual model for CIM European market
 IEC 62325-451-3: Transmission capacity allocation business process and contextual models for European market
 IEC 62325-451-4: Settlement and reconciliation business process, contextual and assembly models for European market
 IEC 62325-451-5: Problem statement and status request business processes, contextual and assembly models for European market
 IEC 62325-451-6: Publication of information on market, contextual and assembly models for European style market 
 IEC 62325-452: North American style market profiles
 IEC 62325-502: Profile of ebXML
 IEC 62325-503: Market data exchanges guidelines for the IEC 62325-351 profile
 IEC 62325-504: Utilization of web services for electronic data interchanges on the European energy market for electricity
 IEC 62325-550-2: Common dynamic data structures for North American style markets
 IEC 62325-552-1: Dynamic data structures for day ahead markets (DAM)

See also
 IEC TC 57
 IEC 61968
 IEC 61970

References

External links 
 IEC Website for IEC 62325 standards
 Electronic Data Interchange (EDI) Library
 IEC 62325-504 open source implementation.
 

62325
Electric power
Smart grid